Jens Vorsatz (born 13 January 1971 in Schwerte, North Rhine-Westphalia) is a German slalom canoer who competed in the early-to-mid 1990s. He finished 29th in the K-1 event at the 1992 Summer Olympics in Barcelona.

References
 Sports-Reference.com profile

1971 births
Living people
People from Schwerte
Sportspeople from Arnsberg (region)
Canoeists at the 1992 Summer Olympics
German male canoeists
Olympic canoeists of Germany